G&SWR 1 Class may refer to:

 G&SWR 1 Class 0-6-2T
 G&SWR 1 Class 0-4-4T